The Irminger Sea is a marginal sea of the North Atlantic Ocean. It is bordered to the west by southern Greenland, to the north by Iceland and the Denmark Strait, to the east by the Reykjanes Ridge (a northern part of the Mid-Atlantic Ridge), and to the south by open waters of the North Atlantic.

It was named after Danish vice-admiral Carl Ludvig Christian Irminger (1802–1888), after whom the Irminger Current was also named.

Geography
The northern limit is the Greenland–Iceland Rise on the bottom of the Denmark Strait between Iceland and East Greenland, which connects to the Greenland Sea. To the southwest, it reaches to Cape Farvel, the southern tip of Greenland, and meets the Labrador Sea at this point. South of this point is the open North Atlantic Ocean. This delineation is oceanographic only and does not represent any official borders. The Irminger Sea is one of the main fishing areas of the Rose fish.

See also
 King Frederick VI Coast
 List of seas

References

External links 
 Map of Irminger Sea

Seas of the Atlantic Ocean
Seas of Greenland
Greenland–Iceland border
Geography of North America
Geography of Northern Europe